Arco may refer to:

Places
 Arco, Trentino, a town in Trentino, Italy
 Arco, Idaho, in the United States
 Arco, Minnesota, a city in the United States
 ARCO Arena in Sacramento, California, home of the Sacramento Kings

Companies
 ARCO (brand), a brand of gasoline service stations that is currently owned by Marathon Petroleum in Mexico and parts of the United States
 ARCO Chemical, a chemical company formed in 1986 by spinning off a subsidiary from the Atlantic Richfield Company
 ARCO Group, a Belgian cooperative holding company
 Arco Publishing, an American publishing company founded in New York in 1942
 Atlantic Richfield Company, the Atlantic Richfield Company, formerly an independent American petroleum company (1966-2000), currently a subsidiary of BP
 ARCO Solar, a former subsidiary of the Atlantic Richfield Company that manufactured

Music
 Arco, a directive in music for string instruments to return to bowing after playing pizzicato; see bowing
 Associate of the Royal College of Organists, a professional diploma for church organists awarded by the Royal College of Organists
 Arco (band), a British slowcore band

People
 Anton Graf von Arco auf Valley (1897–1945), commonly known as Anton Arco-Valley, murdered Kurt Eisner
 Georg von Arco (1869–1940), early wireless pioneer
 Jean Baptist, Comte d'Arco (c. 1650–1715), a diplomat and Generalfeldmarschall
 Johann Philipp d'Arco (1652–1704), a soldier who served Habsburg Austria

Other uses
 Arco (ARDM-5), a type of U.S. Navy floating drydock
Arco (lamp), a 1962 design, subject of 2006 intellectual property dispute
 A shortened form of arcology
 A male given name in the Netherlands, for example: Arco Jochemsen, a Dutch footballer

See also 
 
 El Arco (disambiguation)
 Arko (disambiguation)